The 2012 Morehead State Eagles football team represented Morehead State University in the 2012 NCAA Division I FCS football season. The Eagles, a member of the Pioneer Football League, played their 49th season at Jayne Stadium on the university campus. They were led by Matt Ballard, who was in his 19th and final season as head coach. Following a 4–7 season, Ballard was fired.

Schedule

References

Morehead State
Morehead State Eagles football seasons
Morehead State Eagles football